

e
E-Base
E-Glades
E-Mycin E
E-Mycin
E-Solve 2
E-Z Prep
E-Z Scrub
E-Z-EM Prep Lyte
E.E.S.. Redirects to Erythromycin.

eb-ec
ebalzotan (INN)
ebanicline tosylate (USAN)
ebastine (INN)
eberconazole (INN)
ebiratide (INN)
ebrotidine (INN)
ebselen (INN)
Ec-naprosyn
ecabapide (INN)
ecabet (INN)
ecadotril (INN)
ecalcidene (USAN)
ecallantide (USAN, INN)
ecastolol (INN)
ecenofloxacin (INN)
ecipramidil (INN)
eclanamine (INN)
eclazolast (INN)
ecogramostim (INN)
ecomustine (INN)
econazole (INN)
Econochlor
Econopred
ecopladib (USAN)
ecothiopate iodide (INN)
ecromeximab (INN, USAN)
Ecstasy
ectylurea (INN)
eculizumab (USAN)

ed
edaravone (INN)
edatrexate (INN)
Edecrin
edelfosine (INN)
edetic acid (INN)
edetol (INN)
Edex. Redirects to Prostaglandin E1.
edifoligide (USAN)
edifolone (INN)
edobacomab (INN)
edodekin alfa (INN)
edogestrone (INN)
edonentan (USAN)
edotecarin (USAN)
edotreotide (USAN)
edoxaban (INN)
edoxudine (INN)
edratide (USAN)
edrecolomab (INN)
edrophonium chloride (INN)
Edrophonium

ef-eg
efalizumab (USAN)
efaproxiral (USAN)
efaroxan (INN)
efavirenz (INN)
efegatran (INN)
efetozole (INN)
Effexor
Efidac/24
efipladib (USAN)
efletirizine (INN)
eflornithine (INN)
efloxate (INN)
eflumast (INN)
efonidipine (INN)
efrotomycin (INN)
Efudex
efungumab (INN)
eglumetad (USAN)
egtazic acid (INN)
egualen (INN)

el

ela-elg
elacridar (INN)
elacytarabine (USAN, INN)
elagolix (USAN, INN)
elantrine (INN)
elanzepine (INN)
Elase-Chloromycetin
Elavil
elbanizine (INN)
elcatonin (INN)
eldacimibe (INN)
eldecalcitol (INN)
Eldecort
Eldepryl
eledoisin (INN)
Elestat
elesclomol (investigational drug/orphan drug)
eletriptan (INN)
elfazepam (INN)
elgodipine (INN)

eli-elp
Elidel
Eligard (Sanofi-Aventis) redirects to leuprorelin
eliglustat (USAN)
Elimite
elinafide (INN)
elinogrel (USAN, INN)
eliprodil (INN)
elisartan (INN)
elisidepsin (INN)
Elitek  (Sanofi-Aventis) redirects to rasburicase
Elixicon
Elixomin
Elixophyllin
ellagic acid (INN)
Ellence
Ellence (Pharmacia & Upjohn Company)
Elliotts B Solution (Orphan Medical)
Elliotts B Solution
elliptinium acetate (INN)
Elmiron
elmustine (INN)
elnadipine (INN)
elocalcitol (INN)
Elocon
elopiprazole (INN)
elotuzumab (USAN)
Eloxatin (Sanofi-Aventis) redirects to oxaliplatin
elpetrigine (USAN, INN)

els-elz
elsamitrucin (INN)
elsibucol (USAN, INN)
elsilimomab (INN)
Elspar (Merck & Co.)
eltanolone (INN)
eltenac (INN)
eltoprazine (INN)
eltrombopag (INN)
eltrombopag olamine (USAN)
elucaine (INN)
elvitegravir (USAN, INN)
elvucitabine (USAN)
elzasonan citrate (USAN)
elzasonan hydrochloride (USAN)
elziverine (INN)